Skateboard Park Tycoon is a business simulation game for Windows.

Gameplay
Tycoon Mode

The aim of the game is to generate money.  The player does this by building a skate park and attracting skaters.  Once the park reaches a certain rating, they can get a sponsor.  The sponsor will pay the park a certain amount of money per day and also unlocks new buildings.

Monkey See Monkey Do

The monkey does a trick and you do it after him.

Instant Action

The same as Tycoon mode, but the player can choose the level and the starting money.  This mode does not help to finish the game.

2001 video games
Activision games
Business simulation games
Windows games
Windows-only games
Cat Daddy Games games
Single-player video games
Video games developed in the United States